Ancylocranium is a genus of amphisbaenians in the family Amphisbaenidae, commonly known as sharp-snouted worm lizards. Three species are placed in this genus, which is endemic to eastern Africa and the Horn of Africa.

Species
The following species are recognized as being valid.
Ancylocranium barkeri Loveridge, 1946 - Lindi sharp-snouted worm lizard
Ancylocranium ionidesi Loveridge, 1955 - Kilwa sharp-snouted worm lizard
Ancylocranium somalicum (Scortecci, 1930) - Somali sharp-snouted worm lizard

Nota bene: A binomial authority in parentheses indicates that the species was originally described in a genus other than Ancylocranium.

References

Further reading

Gans C (2005). "Checklist and Bibliography of the Amphisbaenia of the World". Bull. American Mus. Nat. Hist. (289): 1-130.
Loveridge A (1946). "A new worm-lizard (Ancylocranium barkeri ) from Tanganyika Territory". Proc. Biol. Soc. Washington 59: 73-76, Plate VIII.
Loveridge A (1955). "On a second collection of reptiles and amphibians taken in Tanganyika Territory by C. J. P. Ionides". J. East African Nat. Hist. 22: 168-198. (Anclocranium ionidesi, new species, pp. 169, 177-179).
Parker HW (1942). "The Lizards of British Somaliland". Bull. Mus. Comp. Zool., Harvard Coll. 91 (1): 1-101. (Ancylocranium, new genus, p. 57).
Scortecci G (1930). "Contributo alla conoscenza dei rettili e degli anfibi della Somalia, dell'Eritrea e dell'Abissinia ". Bollettino dei Musei di Zoologia ed Anatomia comparata della R. Università di Torino [Third Series] 41 (10): 1-26. (Anops somalicus, new species). (in Italian).

 
Lizard genera
Taxa named by Hampton Wildman Parker